This article displays the rosters for the teams competing at the 2021 FIBA Women's Asia Cup. Each team had to submit 12 players.

Age and club as of 27 September 2021.

Division A

Group A

India
The roster was announced on 15 September 2021.

Japan
A 13-player roster was announced on 10 September 2021.

New Zealand
A 14-player roster was announced on 30 August 2021.

South Korea
The roster was announced on 3 September 2021.

Group B

Australia
The roster was announced on 1 September 2021.

China

Chinese Taipei

Philippines
The roster was announced on 9 September 2021.

Division B

Group A

Iran

Lebanon

Syria

Group B

Indonesia

Jordan

Kazakhstan

References

External links
Official website

Squads
FIBA Women's Asia Cup squads